Cloud Peak Glacier is in the Bighorn Mountains in the northcentral section of the U.S. state of Wyoming. Centered within the Cloud Peak Wilderness of Bighorn National Forest, Cloud Peak Glacier is the only active glacier in the Bighorn Mountains. The glacier is in a deep cirque immediately northeast of Cloud Peak, the highest peak in the Bighorn Mountains.

Cloud Peak Glacier is retreating rapidly and is expected to disappear entirely sometime between the years 2020 and 2034. Photographs taken in 1905 and again in 2005 demonstrated an obvious reduction in the area the glacier, and more ominously, a huge loss of thickness.

See also
Retreat of glaciers since 1850
List of glaciers in the United States

References

Glaciers of Wyoming
Glaciers of Johnson County, Wyoming
Bighorn National Forest